Walter Verdun Clarke (3 February 1883 – 23 April 1939) was an Australian rules footballer who played with St Kilda in the Victorian Football League (VFL).

References

External links 

1883 births
1939 deaths
Australian rules footballers from Victoria (Australia)
St Kilda Football Club players